Barbara Gronemus (née Barry; November 21, 1931 – January 17, 2021) was an American politician and farmer.

Biography
Gronemus was born in Norwalk, Wisconsin, and graduated from Ontario Public High School. She was a farmer/farm wife and was a nursing home activity director. Gronemus lived in Whitehall, Wisconsin, with her husband and family. She served as a Democratic Party member of the Wisconsin State Assembly, representing the 91st Assembly District from 1982 through 2008. She died at Grandvie Care Center in Blair, Wisconsin.

Notes

External links
Follow the Money – Barbara Gronemus
2006 2004 2002 2000 1998 campaign contributions

Democratic Party members of the Wisconsin State Assembly
1931 births
2021 deaths
Women state legislators in Wisconsin
21st-century American politicians
21st-century American women politicians
Farmers from Wisconsin
People from Monroe County, Wisconsin
People from Whitehall, Wisconsin